The  and its twin the  are sedans sold in Japan from 2001 to 2021 by Toyota. The sedans are designated as a compact car by Japanese dimension regulations and the exterior dimensions do not change with periodic updates. Unlike Toyota's other vehicles, the Premio and Allion are not exported, and are exclusively sold in Japan only. Size and pricing-wise, the E210 Corolla, introduced to the Japanese market in 2018 succeeds the Premio and Allion.

The Premio is the successor of the Corona which first appeared in 1957. The Corona EXiV, a four-door hardtop sedan that appeared in 1989, was replaced by the Progrès, which was also briefly available with the Premio until 2007. The Premio is exclusive to Toyopet Store dealerships, as a smaller companion to the Mark X.

The Allion replaced the Carina, a model that first appeared in 1970. The Carina ED, a four-door hardtop sedan that appeared in 1985, was replaced by the Brevis, which was briefly available with the Allion until 2007. The Allion is exclusive to Toyota Store dealerships, as a smaller companion to the Crown.

Both cars are related to the Avensis, which is an imported five-door liftback from Europe, available at all Japanese dealership locations. The Camry, which is the largest car exclusive to Toyota Corolla Store locations, is slightly larger, and based on appearance packages, offers the same luxury or performance features found in the Premio or Allion. The name "Premio" is a play on words for "premium", while "Allion" is created based on the phrase "all-in-one".

Mechanically, they are identical to the Avensis which is exported new internationally as well as sold in Japan. The Premio/Allion are only offered as 4-door sedans, while the Avensis is available only as a five-door liftback. The first generation Premio is an upscale, luxurious sedan in comparison to the Allion, which has a more youthful, sporting nature. Wood trim and chrome accents give the Premio an elegant look while the Allion is considered to be a sporty or executive type car.

Appearance modification options made for the first generation Allion are not made or marketed for the Premio. The second generation cars share the interior appearances and optional equipment, with exterior visual differences. Three options packages are offered with the three different engines offered, coupled with the choice of front- or four-wheel drive, thereby giving Japanese buyers options as to which annual road tax obligation they are willing to pay.



First generation (T240; 2001) 

The first generation Premio and Allion were launched on 25 December 2001. The Premio sedan has a more elegant approach in comparison to the Allion, which has an emphasis towards younger buyers. The Premio and Allion share the same engines and interior. The Allion can be specced with front spoilers and rear mounted trunk wings, as well as ground effect body parts to enhance the vehicles appearance which are specially designed and sold by Toyota. The Allion also features rear tilting seats (similar to front seats). The Allion continues the Toyota tradition by being made in taxi usage, driving school and law enforcement versions.

On 20 December 2004, the Premio received a modest restyle with the introduction of LED tail lights. The Allion also received an update at the same time.

Both cars were offered with three engine sizes; 1.5-, 1.8- and 2.0-liter. The 2.0-liter model received a CVT; the smaller engines were each fitted with a four-speed torque converter automatic transmission.

Second generation (T260; 2007) 

The second generation Premio and Allion were introduced on 4 June 2007, with Toyota continuing to offer appearance modifications at local dealerships. These cars continued to fill the gap between the Corolla and Camry. G-BOOK was on the list of optional features. The Premio gained the inclusion of a LED in the rear light cluster. Other changes included the smart entry and start system, a rear-view monitor in color, and a hard disk navigation system compatible with the G-Book mX telematics service.

Four-wheel drive was offered on vehicles equipped with the 1.8-liter 2ZR-FE engine. A 2.0-liter valvematic 3ZR-FAE engine was made available in January 2008, cutting the emission by 75 percent from the level required by the 2005 Japanese emission standards, and also achieving 20 percent better fuel economy than required by the 2010 fuel consumption standards. The transmission was a Super CVT-i. The 2.0-liter engine option was discontinued in July 2020.

First facelift (2010) 
The Premio and Allion were revised on 20 April 2010 with more aggressive and sharper looking headlights and twin LED tail lights with the interior remaining somewhat same.

Second facelift (2016) 
Toyota revised the Premio and Allion again on 13 June 2016 with a facelift. At the same time, "bi-beam" LED headlights and the collision avoidance system called "Toyota Safety Sense C" were introduced, adopting a styling influence from the larger, more prestigious S210 series Crown.

Discontinuation 
On 1 December 2020, Toyota announced that the Premio and Allion would be discontinued from March 2021. This marked the end of the Corona lineage that was first introduced in 1957.

Chinese-market Allion (E210; 2021) 

The Allion nameplate is also used as the long-wheelbase version of the E210 series Corolla for the Chinese market. Introduced at the Guangzhou Auto Show in November 2020, the Chinese-market Allion (originally "傲澜"; the change was made because the latter name may sound offensive to Teochew dialect speakers) was developed by the FAW Toyota joint venture. Larger dimensions meant the Allion slots between the Corolla and the Avalon which is called the "A+ class sedan" segment in China.

References

External links 

  (Premio)
  (Allion)

Premio
Cars introduced in 2001
Cars discontinued in 2021
2010s cars
2020s cars
Compact cars
Sedans
Front-wheel-drive vehicles
All-wheel-drive vehicles
Vehicles with CVT transmission